Sohray Amiriyeh (also Romanized as Şoḩrāy Āmīrīyeh) is a village in Dasht Rural District, in the Central District of Shahreza County, Isfahan Province, Iran. At the 2006 census, its population was 55, in 10 families.

References 

Populated places in Shahreza County